Afghans (Persian/; Persian: افغانستانی, romanized: Afghanistani) or Afghan people are nationals or citizens of Afghanistan, or people with ancestry from there. Afghanistan is made up of various ethnicities, of which the Pashtuns, Tajiks, Hazaras and Uzbeks are the largest; the pre-nation state, historical ethnonym Afghan was used to refer to a member of the Pashtun ethnic group. Due to the changing political nature of the state, such as the British-drawn border with Pakistan (then British India) the meaning has changed, and term has shifted to be the national identity of people from Afghanistan from all ethnicities. The two main languages spoken by Afghans are Pashto and Dari (the Afghan dialect of Persian language), and many are bilingual.

Background
The earliest mention of the name Afghan (Abgân) is by Shapur I of the Sassanid Empire during the 3rd century CE, In the 4th century the word "Afghans/Afghana" (αβγανανο) as reference to a particular people is mentioned in the Bactrian documents found in Northern Afghanistan. The word 'Afghan' is of Persian origin to refer to the Pashtun people. In the past, several scholars sought a connection with “horse,” Skt.aśva-, Av.aspa-, i.e.the Aśvaka or Aśvakayana the name of the Aśvakan or Assakan, ancient inhabitants of the Hindu Kush region, however according to some linguists, it would be extremely difficult to reconcile either Aśvaka or Aśvakayana with the world Afghan.

As an adjective, the word Afghan also means "of or relating to Afghanistan or its people, language or culture". According to the 1964 Constitution of Afghanistan, all Afghans citizens are equal in rights and obligations before the law. The fourth article of the current Constitution of Afghanistan states that citizens of Afghanistan consist of Pashtun, Tajik, Hazara, Uzbek, Turkmen, Baloch, Pashayi, Nuristani, Aimaq, Arab, Kyrgyz, Qizilbash, Gurjar, Brahui, and members of other ethnicities. There are political disputes regarding this: there are members of the non-Pashtun ethnicities of Afghanistan that reject the term Afghan being applied to them, and there are Pashtuns in Pakistan that wish to have the term Afghan applied to them.

Afghanistani and Afghanese 
Less commonly Afghanistani (افغانستانی) is an alternative identity marker for citizens of the country Afghanistan. The term "Afghanistani" refers to someone who possesses the nationality of Afghanistan, regardless of what race, ethnic, religious background. In multiethnic Afghanistan, the term "Afghan" has always been associated with Pashtun people. Some non-Pashtun citizens such as Tajiks, Hazaras, and Uzbeks have viewed it as a part of Pashtun hegemony that devised to erase their ethnic identity. The term Afghanistani has been used among some refugees and diasporas, particularly among non-Pashtuns.

History 
Afghanistan has never been a nation-state or dawlat-e milli. \ The local groups and communities across Afghanistan have rather strong local and regional identification as a tribes or ethnic groups (Pashtun, Tajik, Hazara, Uzbek or others). For the past two centuries, Afghanistan rulers have tried to create a state that represents Pashtuns. Early efforts were made to create a strong centralized government based on a national identity of "Afghan," which privileged Pashtuns beyond their ethnic boundaries at state level as a whole. Non-Pashtun ethnic groups were not yet ready to accept a centralized state system let alone accepting a new national identity. They did not have overall or even wider identification with Afghanistan as a whole, not to mention national identity or citizenship that was not given to them by the central government.

Etymology  

From a more limited, ethnological point of view, "Afḡhān" is the term by which the Persian-speakers of Afghanistan (and the non-Pashtō-speaking ethnic groups generally) designate the Pashtūn. The equation Afghans = Pashtūn has been propagated all the more, both in and beyond Afghanistan, because the Pashtūn tribal confederation is by far has maintained its hegemony in the country, numerically and politically.

National Identity 
Afghanistan's early efforts to create a sort of national identity began in 1919, after receiving its independence from the Great Britain. This was the time when Afghanistan completely regain control over its sovereignty. Especially, the Hazara people who are still considered second-class citizens. After the fall of monarchy in 1973, Mohammed Daoud Khan, a staunch partisan of Pashtunistan, who saw the country not as Afghanistan but a Pashtunistan, a land uniting Pashtuns from NWFP and FATA with Afghanistan. Despite implementing some social and educational progress, he failed to create a national identity. After the Saur Revolution, the central governments tried to advocate for a broader Afghan identity through the use of modern education, but their efforts met with limited success. One of the most common hurdles for fostering a common national identity was the fact they ethnic groups such as Hazara, Uzbeks, or Tajiks could not identify with elements of an identity that had strong base in Pashtun ethnicity that ruled the country.

Other identifiers: Afghani and Afghanese
The term Afghani refers to the unit of Afghan currency. The term is also often used in the English language (and appears in some dictionaries) for a person or thing related to Afghanistan, although some have expressed the opinion that this usage is incorrect. A reason for the confusion can be because the apparent incorrect term "Afghani" (افغانی) is in fact a valid demonym for Afghans in the overall Persian language and in Hindustani, whereas "Afghan" is derived from Pashto. Thus "Afghan" is the anglicized term of "Afghani" when translating from Dari or Hindi-Urdu, but not Pashto.  Another variant is Afghanese, which has been seldom used in place of Afghan.

Ethnicities

Afghans come from various ethnic backgrounds. Pashtuns form a plurality of the population, while Tajiks, Hazaras and Uzbeks are the next largest and altogether the four form almost 60% of the population. They are of diverse origins including of Iranian, Turkic and Mongol ethnolinguistic roots.

Religions

The Afghan people of all ethnicities are predominantly and traditionally followers of Islam, of whom most are of the Sunni branch. Other religious minorities include the Afghan Hindus, Afghan Sikhs, Afghan Jews and Afghan Christians.

Culture

See also

 Demographics of Afghanistan
 Afghan (ethnonym)
 Name of Afghanistan
 Afghan diaspora
 Pashtuns
 Durand Line

Notes and references

Further reading

External links
 
 Afghan News

Exonyms